The Premio Nazionale Carriera Esemplare "Gaetano Scirea" (""Gaetano Scirea" Exemplary Career National Award") is a recognition dedicated to footballers over the age of 30 playing in Italy's Serie A. Established in 1992, the prize is awarded annually for their playing ability and sportsmanship by the Unione Stampa Sportiva Italiana (Italian Sports Press Association) or USSI.

History and regulations
The recognition was created in honour of Italian defender Gaetano Scirea, who died in a car crash on 3 September 1989. The prize is awarded annually to Serie A Italian footballer over the age of 30 who has stood out throughout their career both for their playing ability and sportsmanship. All Italian journalists are called to vote one recipient from a shortlist of selected candidates.

Winners

Notes

References

See also
Premio internazionale Giacinto Facchetti

External links
Official website

Awards established in 1992
Italian football trophies and awards
European football trophies and awards
Serie A trophies and awards
Serie A players
Sportsmanship trophies and awards
Association football player non-biographical articles